"The Bob (Medley)" is a song written by Bryan Ferry and recorded by Roxy Music, appearing on the eponymous debut album. The song's title is an acronym for Battle of Britain. The sound of gunfire and explosions from the battlefields can be heard throughout the instrumental refrain. "The Bob (Medley)" was featured in Andrew Reynolds' part of Baker 3.

Song Musicians
 Andy MacKay - Oboe & Saxophone.
 Bryan Ferry - Voice & Piano.
 Brian Eno - Synthesiser & Tapes.
 Graham Simpson - Bass guitar.
 Paul Thompson - Drums.
 Phil Manzanera - Guitar.

1972 songs
Roxy Music songs
Songs written by Bryan Ferry